Pérenchies is a commune in the Nord department in northern France. It is part of the Métropole Européenne de Lille.

Population

Heraldry

People from Pérenchies
Yvonne Abbas (1922-2014), French Resistance worker

See also
Communes of the Nord department

References

Communes of Nord (French department)
French Flanders